Patricia Lock Dawson is an American politician who has been mayor of Riverside, California since 2020, when she was elected. Lock Dawson succeeded Rusty Bailey. She previously spent nine years on the Riverside Unified School District Board of Trustees.

References 

Living people
Mayors of Riverside, California
University of California, Riverside alumni
Year of birth missing (living people)